Marco Sala (19 August 1886 – 14 December 1969) was an Italian professional footballer, who played as a defender.

External links 
Profile at MagliaRossonera.it 
Profile at Inter.it
International caps at FIGC.it 

1886 births
1969 deaths
Italian footballers
Italy international footballers
Association football defenders
A.C. Milan players
Inter Milan players